Lindsay Hanekom (born 15 May 1993) is a South African athlete competing in the 400 metres hurdles. He represented his country at the 2016 Summer Olympics without advancing from the first round.

His personal best in the event is 48.81 seconds set in Germiston in 2019 at the SA Athletics Championships.

International competitions

1Disqualified in the final

References

1993 births
Living people
South African male hurdlers
Athletes (track and field) at the 2016 Summer Olympics
Olympic athletes of South Africa
University of Pretoria alumni
Athletes (track and field) at the 2019 African Games
African Games competitors for South Africa
Competitors at the 2015 Summer Universiade
20th-century South African people
21st-century South African people